ISO 3166-2:KI is the entry for Kiribati in ISO 3166-2, part of the ISO 3166 standard published by the International Organization for Standardization (ISO), which defines codes for the names of the principal subdivisions (e.g., provinces or states) of all countries coded in ISO 3166-1.

Currently for Kiribati, ISO 3166-2 codes are defined for 3 groups of islands (20 inhabited islands). The groups of islands are geographical subdivisions, as the country has no official administrative subdivisions.

Each code consists of two parts, separated by a hyphen. The second part is a letter.

Current codes
Subdivision names are listed as in the ISO 3166-2 standard published by the ISO 3166 Maintenance Agency (ISO 3166/MA).

Click on the button in the header to sort each column.

Changes
The following changes to the entry are listed on ISO's online catalogue, the Online Browsing Platform:

See also
 Subdivisions of Kiribati
 FIPS region codes of Kiribati

External links
 ISO Online Browsing Platform: KI
 Island Groups of Kiribati, Statoids.com

2:KI
ISO 3166-2
Kiribati geography-related lists